Alex Miller (October 11, 1922 – January 29, 1998) was an American political advisor and lobbyist active in Alaska. He was born in 1922 to Montenegrin Serb immigrants in Juneau, where he spent much of his life. Miller served as a Democratic National Committeeman and administrative assistant to William A. Egan, the first Governor. During Egan's administration, he was described as the most powerful lobbyist in Alaska.

References

1922 births
1998 deaths
Alaska Democrats
American people of Serbian descent
American people of Montenegrin descent
Businesspeople from Alaska
Politicians from Juneau, Alaska
20th-century American businesspeople